Augustine Frizzell (born July 27, 1979) is an American actress, film director, and screenwriter. She made her feature film directorial debut with Never Goin' Back (2018).

Early life
Growing up in Garland, Texas, Frizzell attended South Garland High School. She took classes at Richland College.

Career
Frizzell made her directorial debut with the 2018 film Never Goin' Back, which starred Maia Mitchell and Camila Morrone as two waitresses trying to get to Galveston. The film premiered at the 2018 Sundance Film Festival, and was later distributed by A24.

In 2018, Frizzell directed the pilot for HBO's Euphoria.

Frizzel's next film was an adaptation of Jojo Moyes novel The Last Letter from Your Lover. The film starred Felicity Jones and Shailene Woodley and premiered in 2021 through online streaming service Netflix.

Frizzel is set to direct the Ryan Reynolds film Stoned Alone.

Personal life
Frizzell is the granddaughter of musician Lefty Frizzell. She is married to fellow filmmaker David Lowery.

Frizzell has a daughter, Atheena Frizzell, who is also a director and actress.

Filmography
Films

Television

References

External links
 

Living people
1979 births
20th-century American actresses
American film directors
American women screenwriters
People from Garland, Texas
21st-century American actresses